The 2019 General Motors strike began September 15, 2019, with the walkout of 48,000 United Automobile Workers from some 50 plants in the United States. Demands by workers included increased job security, gateway for temporary workers to become permanent, better pay and retaining healthcare benefits.

The strike lasted six weeks, and ended when GM conceded to union demands on wage growth and health care costs because the new contract allows GM to close three factories: the Lordstown Assembly plant, the Baltimore plant, and the Warren Transmission plant. The new contract includes agreements that "in-progression" workers now get a faster path to top pay: four years from $17 per hour to $28 per hour rather than eight, $75,000-85,000 assistance packages for workers at the three closing plants, and 4% lump sum wage payments in the first and third years with 3% base wage increases in alternating years.

Background
This strike constituted the first major labor action in the American automotive industry in a decade. The last strike coordinated by the UAW targeting General Motors occurred in 2007.

Motivations
During the Great Recession and economic uncertainty that followed, unionized automotive workers accepted concessions to allow GM and other companies to recover. Though GM has since received large tax breaks and returned to profitability, worker compensation remained stagnant, and the UAW took umbrage with the company's decisions to shutter American facilities and move some jobs abroad.

Strike
The contract between the UAW and General Motors expired September 14, and the strike began at 11:59pm on Sunday, September 15, 2019. A two day difference between contract expiration and the beginning of a strike is unusually short, but likely motivated by the prolonged negotiations between management and the union. The strike involved 48,000 GM employees.

On September 17, GM stopped providing health insurance to 55,000 union members, forcing the UAW to pay for COBRA.

On September 26, it was announced that GM would start to pay health insurance again to people on strike.

On October 16, It was announced that GM and The UAW agreed on a new labor contract that could end a month-long strike by 48,000 workers. Although the agreement between GM and UAW has not been officially approved, and workers who are still on strike said that they will wait until the deal has been approved completely before they return to their jobs. The new contract was ratified by UAW members on October 25, ending the strike
The strike lasted six weeks, and ended when GM conceded to union demands on wage growth and health care costs because the new contract allows GM to close three factories: the Lordstown plant, the Baltimore plant, and a transmission plant in Warren. The new contract includes agreements that "in-progression" workers now get a faster path to top pay: four years to $28 per hour rather than eight, $75,000-85,000 assistance packages for workers at the three closing plants, and 4% lump sum wage payments in the first and third years with 3% base wage increases in alternating years.

Impact
An analyst for Credit Suisse estimated GM could lose as much as $50 million each day the strike continues, while other analysts estimated daily losses could be as high as $100 million per day. GM's share of the automobile market has decreased from 30% in the late 1990s to 17% today, meaning the strike will likely have fewer implications for the economy at large when compared to labor actions in the past. The strike was also predicted to possibly lead to impacts on GM factories abroad, which rely on parts produced in American factories closed due to the strike, and on suppliers such as Canada-based Magna International.

At the beginning of the strike, GM had roughly 83 days' worth of inventory available for sale, temporarily insulating its supply chain from the impact of the strike.

Reactions
The Teamsters refused to deliver GM cars during the strike, in solidarity with GM workers.

Members of the Trump administration, including Larry Kudlow and Peter Navarro allegedly intervened in negotiations. GM and the White House have both denied Kudlow and Navarro's involvement.

On Saturday September 21, Senator Elizabeth Warren, running at the time for the Democratic nomination for President of the United States, joined a UAW picket line in Detroit. Other Democratic contenders for the nomination including Senator Bernie Sanders, former vice-president Joe Biden, Senator Amy Klobuchar, and  Representative Tim Ryan, also visited picket lines during the strike.

References

General Motors
General Motors
Labor disputes in the United States
Labor disputes led by the United Auto Workers
General Motors
Labor disputes in Michigan
General Motors labor relations